is a Japanese manga series by Hajime Segawa. It began serialization in Kadokawa Shoten's Shōnen Ace magazine on February 26, 2010, and finished on July 26, 2016. It follows a high school girl named Rinka Urushiba who lives with her father in poor conditions. This leads her to work part-time as a waitress. Her life changes when she gains the ability to use extrasensory perception (ESP). An anime television series adaptation aired from July to September 2014.

Plot
Tokyo ESP begins with Rinka Urushiba as a fairly normal high school girl, though she is a bit poor and her father who is a police officer is her only family. This forces her to work part-time as a waitress after high school in order to raise money for them to secure rent and food. One day, she sees a penguin and some glowing fish swimming through the sky. Rinka might have thought it was a hallucination if there had not been another witness with her. This witness is a boy from her school with a strangely scratched-up face. Out of curiosity, she touches one of the glowing fish, which causes her to pass out. After she wakes up, she finds out that she has developed the power to phase through inanimate objects such as the floor of her apartment. She meets a fellow high school student named Kyotaro Azuma who has the ability to teleport. The two of them use their ESP powers to take on individuals who have decided to use them for evil. However, there is an organization that is planning a bigger scheme to secure utopia with their ranks consisting of strong ESP fighters and users.

Characters

Main characters

In the first arc, Rinka is a high school girl with a strong sense of justice as a direct result of her father who is a former cop that taught her his ways. She gains the power to phase through inanimate objects at the start of the series. She is called "White Girl" by the media because when using her powers, her hair turns pure white. This only happens in the anime version.

In the first arc, he attends to the same high school of Rinka and is Rinka's friend. Azuma has the ability of teleporting from one place to another. While hiding his identity as a hero, he uses a crow mask and a tuxedo and calls himself "Crow Head".

In the second arc, her ESP power can form blocks of ice that can be placed on any kind of material. She is the target of terrorists because of her mysterious 'lock space' power.

In the second arc, he works for the ESP Police Force and is ordered to protect Ren. His ESP is metalbending even though the actuate of it is unknown as he is able to "transform" machinery and vehicles into "stuff". An example is he turned a police car into a robot.

Rinka's dad. He gains the power of creating a magnetic field around him attracting and repelling metallic objects. A former police officer who was forced to retire for being unable to look the other way at the corruption of his department. He has been unemployed ever since.

Kobushi is a young thief who has the ability to become invisible. She is known to announce her misdeeds in advance. She is a very good boxer and loves fighting policemen mixing her invisibility ability and her boxing skill. She has a great ego and hates losing a fight. After being saved by Rindō, she develops a crush on him and calls him her "Prince". She starts staying with Rinka, much to her dismay.

The daughter of a Yakuza boss, she gained psychometry, which is the ability to see an object's past by touching it from a glowing fish. If this power is used on a weapon then the skills its previous owner had are temporarily passed to Murasaki. Because of her low stamina, she cannot use them for too long.

A son of one of the most outspoken people against Espers and everything they stand for. He has the power of Precognition, but he can only see two seconds into the future. He is a middle school student with aspirations to be a member of Congress, like his mother. He always gets upset when someone calls his hairstyle an afro.

A martial arts master who trained much of the Tokyo Police Force, including Rinka's father. He is constantly dressed in a panda suit and is an Esper himself, with the power of clairvoyance.

A mysterious penguin with the ability to fly. It's also known as "The Collector" and has the power to remove and eat other people's ESP abilities.

A pelican that Azuma meets when he is left on a deserted island and it helps him escape. It can communicate to him because it gained powers of Telepathy from the glowing fish. It later joins the heroes in their crime fighting. Its telepathy is so strong it can nullify the Professor's illusions.

Antagonists
 

Kyōtarō and Minami's adoptive father who leads the group that is letting the glowing fish roam free. His ESP powers allow him to create all types of illusions. He has a burn scar on the left side of his face that he keeps hidden behind an illusion. The murder of his wife and colleagues at the hands of someone from the Japanese government made him see the world as hopeless. He desires to change the world. After releasing thousands of glowing fish into Tokyo, he was seemly killed by The Siblings. However, he was shown to be alive. He was taken hostage instead.

Minami is Azuma's adoptive sister who follows The Professor. She is also capable of teleporting. She fights wielding 2 katanas. Despite being ruthless while fighting, she still deeply cares for Kyōtarō and desires to defeat Rinka.

Kobushi's younger sister and the other Black Fist. She has a teleportation ability as well. However, she can only teleport other people and things and not herself by touching them. She desires the title of "Black Fist" in the Kuroi family. To do that, she must steal something valuable enough to please their grandmother. She joins the Professor for her own reasons.

A Chinese girl recruited by the Professor who calls herself "The Evil Ghost of the Woods". Besides her martial arts, her ESP is the power of repulsion and is the opposite of Rindō's ESP. She likes to make attacks directed at the eyes.

Others

A police Inspector and Rindō's former co-worker. He and the other cops received martial arts training from Master Youdani.

Ayumu's mother who is a member of Congress. She believed all espers were criminals until she was saved by her son and started to change the way of seeing them.

Production
Plans for Tokyo ESP started when Segawa was still doing his Ga-Rei manga, discussing ideas with his then editor and supervisor when the latter suggested that his next work should be based on superpowers. Segawa suggested that his protagonist should be based from someone in the Matrix series with the comical ability to use his fart as a weapon with the addition of drama before the supervisor told him to take out the farting ability. Segawa decided to go with the female lead like he did with the Ga-Rei manga series. During brainstorming, Segawa pitched an idea to his staff that the female could have fearsome superpowers due to the concern that the female lead will not be prominently known if a male character helps her out, which was met with some opposition from his supervisor again.

Media

Manga
Tokyo ESP is written and illustrated by Hajime Segawa. It began serialization in Kadokawa Shoten's Shōnen Ace magazine with the April 2010 issue. The first tankōbon volume was released on July 26, 2010, and thirteen volumes have been released as of June 22, 2015. The English translation for the manga was released as 2-in-1 volumes in America.

Volume list

Anime

Episode list

Merchandise
Some of the merchandise being released by Kadokawa Shoten include phone cards, tumbles and drawings autographed by Segawa.

China ban
On June 12, 2015, the Chinese Ministry of Culture listed Tokyo ESP among 38 anime and manga titles banned in China.

References

External links
Official anime website 

Anime series based on manga
Censored television series
Funimation
Kadokawa Shoten manga
Kadokawa Dwango franchises
School life in anime and manga
Science fantasy anime and manga
Shōnen manga
Television censorship in China
Tokyo MX original programming
Urban fantasy anime and manga
Vertical (publisher) titles
Works banned in China